L.A.M.F. (abbreviation of Like a Motherfucker) is the only studio album by the American punk rock band The Heartbreakers, which included Johnny Thunders, Jerry Nolan, Walter Lure and Billy Rath. It was released on October 3, 1977 by
the British independent record label Track Records, and the music of the album is a mixture of punk and rock and roll.

In a 1977 interview in the UK monthly magazine ZigZag, Thunders said the album title originated from New York gang graffiti. Thunders claimed the gangs would add the LAMF tag after writing their gang name.  However, if they were on another gang's territory they would write "D.T.K.L.A.M.F" (Down to Kill Like a Mother Fucker). The original, vinyl release of the album has been criticised for having a lackluster sound despite several attempts to remix it.

Background 
The Heartbreakers had been trying to get a record contract in the United States since their formation in 1975.

In the autumn of 1976, Malcolm McLaren, who had informally managed the New York Dolls in their waning days, invited the band to come to England and participate in the Sex Pistols' Anarchy tour, along with The Clash and The Damned, who were replaced by Buzzcocks shortly after the tour commenced. The band accepted the offer, arriving in London on December 1, the same day that the Pistols swore at Bill Grundy on live, prime-time television, which precipitated the cancellation of most of the tour.

Stranded in England with little money after the Anarchy tour came to a halt, the band contemplated a retreat to New York, but their manager, Leee Black Childers, convinced them to stay in England, believing that they would be more successful there. After several gigs in London, Track Records offered the Heartbreakers a recording contract.

Track asked the band to sign to the company as "The Chris Stamp Band Ltd." a holding company owned by Track, with the proviso that if that holding company went out of business, the rights to any recordings the band made would revert to the band's own business partnership. The band agreed and signed on to Track.

Recording session order 
The band prepared for the album with a three-day demo session at Essex Studios in late February 1977, followed by two live shows at London's Speakeasy Club, which were recorded by Track Records for future release.

Six songs: "All By Myself", "Let Go", "Get Off The Phone", "I Wanna Be Loved", "Can't Keep My Eyes On You", and "I Love You" were recorded at Essex with Track staff producer Speedy Keen. The band then switched to Ramport Studios (owned by The Who) to record eight more songs. During a break in the recording, the Who's Pete Townshend invited the Heartbreakers to appear as extras in the movie version of Quadrophenia.

Post-production 
Mixing the recording was problematic. The band went to different studios, each member trying their own mixes. Each mix would be considered and rejected, after which band members returned to the studio to try to remix it. The band was later alleged to have used taxicabs to commute between London and Birmingham, billed to Track Records, to replenish their drug supply. The mixing sessions lasted through the summer of 1977, as they continued playing live.

Critical reception 

L.A.M.F. would be released by Track Records on October 3, 1977. Critic Jon Savage wrote in Sounds magazine, "The sounds (mostly) are great, the playing assured ... so what's the problem? The mixing. The fantasy that they are includes an element of self-destruction, and here's where it operates — they can't seem to get it quite right ... Whichever way, some of the songs ... sound muddy — irritating 'cause you know how good they  be."

Jerry Nolan told the rest of the band that if the album was released "without a proper mix", he would see no reason to remain in the band. Nolan quit during a UK tour, during which time Sex Pistols drummer Paul Cook filled in, until Nolan was asked to return as a hired hand.

Music critic Robert Christgau named the album one of the few import-only records from the 1970s he loved yet omitted from Christgau's Record Guide: Rock Albums of the Seventies (1981).

Resurrection 
After Track Records went out of business, manager Leee Black Childers acquired The Heartbreakers' tapes; the Essex demos, the Speakeasy live recordings and the masters from the L.A.M.F. sessions, including thirty-five reels full of various mixes, from the Track Records offices, due in part to the contract provision the band signed early in 1977.

In 1982, the rights to The Heartbreakers' tapes were acquired from Childers, acting on behalf of the band partnership, by Jungle Records, an independent English label. Jungle convinced Thunders and former Generation X bassist Tony James (then with Sigue Sigue Sputnik) to remix L.A.M.F..

Johnny Thunders died in 1991 and Jerry Nolan died in 1992.

In 1994, Jungle Records executive Alan Hauser had The Heartbreakers' tapes reviewed, and had the best available mixes preserved on Digital Audio Tape. It was soon discovered by Hauser that many of the original mixes left behind by The Heartbreakers were best suited to the band's protopunk sound, while others had a sound similar to sixties pop hits. It was realized that the problem with the sound on the original Track Records release of L.A.M.F. was due to the manufacturing of the vinyl records. A rare cassette edition, released by Track at the same time, was said to "[sound] as if it had a shower, shave, coffee and a cigarette" (liner notes of 2002 reissue by Nina Antonia, p. 10).

The 300-plus available mixes were narrowed down to a shortlist of 50 tracks, and London-area friends and colleagues of Johnny Thunders, including sometime Thunders collaborator Patti Palladin and journalist Nina Antonia, were asked for their input.

The first edition of what is sometimes referred to as L.A.M.F.: The Lost '77 Mixes was released by Jungle in 1994. Eight years later, a remastered edition, appended with an MPEG video of "Chinese Rocks", was released. In 2012 Jungle released L.A.M.F.: Definitive Edition.

In 2021, Jungle located a copy master of the 1977 sessions that belonged to the co-producer, Daniel Secunda. It was released as L.A.M.F. the found '77 masters, firstly as a Record Store Day vinyl LP and then on CD together with a second disc of demo recordings. It was reported to not suffer from the original album's sound problems.

Track listing

Original Track Records release 
 "Born to Lose" (as spelled on label)/"Born Too Loose" (as spelled on sleeve)
 "Baby Talk"
 "All by Myself" (Walter Lure, Jerry Nolan)
 "I Wanna Be Loved"
 "It's Not Enough"
 "Chinese Rocks" (Dee Dee Ramone, Richard Hell) (*see below)
 "Get Off the Phone" (Walter Lure, Jerry Nolan)
 "Pirate Love"
 "One Track Mind" (Walter Lure, Jerry Nolan)
 "I Love You"
 "Goin' Steady"
 "Let Go" (Johnny Thunders, Jerry Nolan)

L.A.M.F. Revisited 
 "One Track Mind" (Walter Lure, Jerry Nolan)
 "I Wanna Be Loved"
 "Pirate Love"
 "Let Go" (Johnny Thunders, Jerry Nolan)
 "Do You Love Me?" (Berry Gordy, Jr.)
 "Can't Keep My Eyes on You" (Walter Lure, Jerry Nolan)
 "Get Off the Phone" (Walter Lure, Jerry Nolan)
 "All by Myself" (Walter Lure, Jerry Nolan)
 "Chinese Rocks" (Dee Dee Ramone, Richard Hell) (*see below)
 "Baby Talk"
 "Goin' Steady"
 "It's Not Enough"
 "I Love You"
 "Born Too Loose" (aka "Born to Lose")

L.A.M.F.: The Lost '77 Mixes

Disc one 
Disc one is the version of L.A.M.F. compiled by Jungle Records in 1994.
 "Born to Lose"
 "Baby Talk"
 "All by Myself" (Walter Lure, Jerry Nolan)
 "I Wanna Be Loved"
 "It's Not Enough"
 "Chinese Rocks" (Dee Dee Ramone, Richard Hell) (*see below)
 "Get Off the Phone" (Walter Lure, Jerry Nolan)
 "Pirate Love"
 "One Track Mind" (Walter Lure, Jerry Nolan)
 "I Love You"
 "Goin' Steady"
 "Let Go" (Johnny Thunders, Jerry Nolan)
 "Can't Keep My Eyes on You" (Walter Lure, Jerry Nolan)
 "Do You Love Me?" (Berry Gordy, Jr.)

Disc two 
Disc two is a collection of demos, outtakes, and alternate mixes.
 "Born Too Loose"
 "Chinese Rocks"
 "Let Go"
 Tracks 1–3 are from the Essex Studios demo sessions, February 20–22, 1977.
 "Goin' Steady" (backing track)
 "Baby Talk" (backing track)
 "Pirate Love" (backing track)
 "Born to Lose" (backing track)
 "Chinese Rocks" (backing track)
 "Do You Love Me?"
 Tracks 4–9 are outtakes from the Ramport Studio sessions, with studio chatter and false starts indexed as countdown time on the CD.
 "Can't Keep My Eyes on You"
 Track 10 is a single B-side, recorded live at London's Speakeasy in early 1977.
 "Get Off the Phone" (alternate mix)
 Mixed at Olympic Studio, May 16, 1977
 "All by Myself" (alternate mix)
 Mixed at Ramport Studio, date unknown, 1977
 "It's Not Enough" (alternate mix)
 Mixed at Ramport Studio, June 1, 1977
 "One Track Mind" (alternate mix)
 Mixed at Ramport Studio, June 27, 1977
 "Too Much Junkie Business" (Walter Lure, Johnny Thunders)
 "London Boys" (Johnny Thunders, Walter Lure, Billy Rath)
 Tracks 15–16 are demos done for EMI Records at Riverside Studio, London, December 13, 1977. These two tracks were produced by Mike Thorne

All tracks on both discs written by Johnny Thunders except where noted.

(*)Note: The original Track Records version of L.A.M.F. credited Dee Dee Ramone, Johnny Thunders, Jerry Nolan and Richard Hell with the writing of "Chinese Rocks". Jungle Records corrected this error for their 1994 and subsequent editions of the album, providing the credit attributing the song's authorship to Joey, Johnny and Dee Dee Ramone. The 2021 release of L.A.M.F.: The Found '77 Masters restored the proper songwriting credit to Dee Dee Ramone and Richard Hell, as indicated on the online databases for both BMI and ASCAP.

L.A.M.F.: Definitive Edition 

In 2012 Jungle Records released a new version, consisting of 4 CDs.

Disc one: The Lost '77 Mixes 
Disc one is the same as released in 1994.
 "Born Too Loose" (aka "Born to Lose")
 "Baby Talk"
 "All by Myself" (Walter Lure, Jerry Nolan)
 "I Wanna Be Loved"
 "It's Not Enough"
 "Chinese Rocks" (Dee Dee Ramone, Richard Hell) (*see above)
 "Get Off the Phone" (Walter Lure, Jerry Nolan)
 "Pirate Love"
 "One Track Mind" (Walter Lure, Jerry Nolan)
 "I Love You"
 "Goin' Steady"
 "Let Go" (Johnny Thunders, Jerry Nolan)
 "Can't Keep My Eyes on You" (Walter Lure, Jerry Nolan)
 "Do You Love Me?" (Berry Gordy, Jr.)

Disc two: The Track LP restored 
Disc two is a restored version of the original album.
 "Born Too Loose" (aka "Born to Lose")
 "Baby Talk"
 "All by Myself" (Walter Lure, Jerry Nolan)
 "I Wanna Be Loved"
 "It's Not Enough"
 "Chinese Rocks" (Dee Dee Ramone, Richard Hell) (*see above)
 "Get Off the Phone" (Walter Lure, Jerry Nolan)
 "Pirate Love"
 "One Track Mind" (Walter Lure, Jerry Nolan)
 "I Love You"
 "Goin' Steady"
 "Let Go" (Johnny Thunders, Jerry Nolan)

Disc three: The demo session 
Disc three contains 13 demos, recorded in three different studios from 1976 to 1977. Tracks 1–4 were recorded at SBS Studios in January 1976 with Richard Hell still in the band. Tracks 5–10 were recorded at Jay Nap Studios in late 1976. Tracks 11–13 were recorded in February 1977 at Essex Studios.
 "I Wanna Be Loved" (Mix 2)
 "Pirate Love"
 "Going Steady"
 "Flight" (Walter Lure)
 "Born to Lose"
 "Can't Keep My Eyes on You" (Walter Lure, Jerry Nolan)
 "It's Not Enough"
 "I Love You"
 "Take a Chance" (Walter Lure, Jerry Nolan)
 "Do You Love Me?" (Berry Gordy, Jr.)
 "Let Go" (Johnny Thunders, Jerry Nolan)
 "Chinese Rocks" (Dee Dee Ramone, Richard Hell) (*see above)
 "Born to Lose"

Disc four: The alternative mixes 
Disc four is a selection of alternative mixes from different studios and different days in 1977, chosen from a 'short-list' of 54 mixes.
 "Born to Lose"
 Essex Studio, February 20
 "Born to Lose"
 Ramport Studio, March 22
 "Baby Talk"
 Ramport Studio, June 5
 "Baby Talk"
 Advision Studio, September 15
 "All by Myself"
 Olympic Studio, May 16
 "All by Myself"
 Ramport Studio, date unknown
 "It's Not Enough"
 Ramport Studio, June 1
 "It's Not Enough"
 Ramport Studio, June 27
 "Chinese Rocks"
 Ramport Studio, March 22
 "Get Off the Phone"
 Olympic Studio, May 16
 "Pirate Love"
 Ramport Studio, June 7
 "Pirate Love"
 Ramport Studio, July 2
 "One Track Mind"
 Ramport Studio, June 22
 "One Track Mind"
 Advision Studio, September 10
 "I Love You"
 Ramport Studio, June 11
 "Goin' Steady"
 Olympic Studio, May 19
 "Goin' Steady"
 Ramport Studio, July 22
 "Let Go"
 Ramport Studio, June 10
 "Let Go"
 Ramport Studio, July 2
 "Can't Keep My Eyes on You"
 Ramport Studio, April 22
 "Do You Love Me"
 Ramport Studio, July 22

L.A.M.F: The Found '77 Masters

Disc One
Disc One's track listing replicates the Lost '77 Mixes track listing, including "Can't Keep My Eyes Off You" and "Do You Love Me", however using the mixes from Danny Secunda's copy of the original master tape rather than the outtake remixes used on the 1994 CD.

Disc Two: The Demo Sessions, Plus
Disc Two is an entirely new sequence of demos and outtakes from the period.
"Born to Lose" (Chris Stamp single mix)
"Chinese Rocks" (Chris Stamp single mix)
"Born Too Loose" (Essex Studio demo, Feb. '77)
"Chinese Rocks" (Essex Studio demo, Feb. '77)
"Let Go" (Essex Studio demo, Feb. '77)
"I Love You" (Jay Nap Studio demo, 1976)
"It's Not Enough" (Jay Nap Studio demo, 1976)
"Do You Love Me" (Jay Nap Studio demo, 1976)
"Take a Chance" (Jay Nap Studio demo, 1976)
"Born to Lose" (Jay Nap Studio demo, 1976)
"I Wanna Be Loved" (SBS Studio demo, Jan. '76)
"Going Steady" (SBS Studio demo, Jan. '76)
"Flight" (SBS Studio demo, Jan. '76)
"Pirate Love" (SBS Studio demo, Jan. '76)
"Give Her a Great Big Kiss" (Riverside Studio demo, Dec. 1977)
"Too Much Junkie Business" (Riverside Studio demo, Dec. 1977)
"London Boys" (Riverside Studio demo, Dec. 1977)
"Can't Keep My Eyes On You" (live) (single B-side, 1977j

Personnel 
The Heartbreakers
 Johnny Thunders - Lead and backing vocals, lead and rhythm guitar
 Walter Lure - Backing and lead vocals, lead and rhythm guitar
 Billy Rath - bass
 Jerry Nolan - drums, backing vocals
Technical
Roberta Bayley - cover photography

References

Sources 
 liner notes of Jungle Records 2002 edition of L.A.M.F., by Nina Antonia with comments by Walter Lure.
 Johnny Thunders - In Cold Blood, Nina Antonia, Cherry Red Books (2000) .
 Punk Diary: The Ultimate Trainspotter's Guide To Underground Rock, George Gimarc, Backbeat Press (2005) 
 Trouser Press Record Guide online entry on Heartbreakers
 Johnny Thunders Cyber Lounge
 Johnny Thunders chronological info

Further reading 
 

Johnny Thunders albums
1977 debut albums
Jungle Records albums
Track Records albums